The 1973 European Junior Badminton Championships was the third edition of the European Junior Badminton Championships. It was held in Edinburgh, Scotland, in the month of April. Danish players won both the singles disciplines and mixed doubles while England won Girls' doubles, and Sweden won Boys' doubles title.

Medalists

Results

Semi-finals

Finals

Medal table

References 

European Junior Badminton Championships
European Junior Badminton Championships
European Junior Badminton Championships
European Junior Badminton Championships
International sports competitions hosted by Scotland